The Coat of arms of Santa Clara, Cuba is the official heraldic symbol of Santa Clara, Cuba. The first version of the shield was donated by José Machado in 1887. It was made official by the Municipal Assembly of People’s Power of Santa Clara in 1987.

Official description 
The Santa Clara official website describes the coat of arms as follows:

The shield had on the upper part the MURAL CROWN (city symbol) It is composed of two barracks, in the upper one there is a hill with a mountain cayo to which the remedian families headed to found the villa and the City Key, a piece that has millenously represented the cities and as it is purple means that the city without prejudice, it is obliged to protect The lower barracks are represented by a hut and a tamarind. The currencies were: Homeland, Religion, Family.

Gallery

See also
 Coat of arms of Havana
 Coat of arms of Cuba

References

Cuba
Cuba
Cuba